Hull is the name of some places in the U.S. state of Wisconsin:

Hull, Marathon County, Wisconsin, a town
Hull, Portage County, Wisconsin, a town

es:Hull (Wisconsin)